Rich Township is one of 29 townships in Cook County, Illinois, United States located south of Chicago. As of the 2020 census, its population was 76,138. Richton Park serves as the governmental seat for the township.

Geography

Cities, towns, villages
 Country Club Hills (south half)
 Flossmoor (west three-quarters)
 Frankfort (small portion)
 Hazel Crest (small portion)
 Homewood (small portion)
 Matteson 
 Olympia Fields (vast majority)
 Park Forest (north three-quarters)
 Richton Park
 Tinley Park (small portion)
 University Park (small portion)

Unicorporated Towns
 Flossmoor Highlands at

Adjacent townships
 Bremen Township (north)
 Thornton Township (northeast)
 Bloom Township (east)
 Monee Township, Will County (south)
 Green Garden Township, Will County (southwest)
 Frankfort Township, Will County (west)
 Orland Township (northwest)

Cemeteries
The township contains these eight cemeteries: Coopers Grove, Elliott Family, Lutheran, New German Evangelical Zion, Saint Anne, Saint Pauls Evangelical Lutheran, Saint Pauls Evangelical Reform and Zion Evangelical Lutheran.

Major highways
  Interstate 57
  Interstate 80
  U.S. Route 45
  U.S. Route 30
  Illinois Route 43
  Illinois Route 50

Airports and landing strips
 Olympia Fields Osteopathic Medical Center Heliport
 Prosperi Airport (historical)

Other Places
 Lincoln Mall

Landmarks
 Augustinian Seminary
 South Green Belt Forest Preserve (vast majority)

Demographics

As of 2020, the racial makeup of Rich Township was 74.1% African-American, 16.7% White, 1.1% Asian, 4.9% Multiracial, and 2.9% some other race. Hispanic or Latino of any race made up 6.1% of the population.

Political districts
 Illinois's 2nd congressional district
 State House District 37
 State House District 38
 State House District 80
 State Senate District 19
 State Senate District 40

Education
 Rich Township High School
 Southland College Preparatory Charter High School
 Homewood-Flossmoor High School
 Elementary School District 159
 Country Club Hills School District 160
 Flossmoor School District 161
 Matteson School District 162
 Park Forest School District 163

References
 
 United States Census Bureau 2007 TIGER/Line Shapefiles
 United States National Atlas

External links
 Rich Township official website
 City-Data.com
 Illinois State Archives
 Township Officials of Illinois
 Cook County official site

Townships in Cook County, Illinois
Townships in Illinois